The Secret of Shadow Ranch is the tenth installment in the Nancy Drew point-and-click adventure game series by Her Interactive. The game is available for play on Microsoft Windows platforms. It has an ESRB rating of E for moments of mild violence and peril. Players take on the first-person view of fictional amateur sleuth Nancy Drew and must solve the mystery through interrogation of suspects, solving puzzles, and discovering clues. There are two levels of gameplay, Junior and Senior detective modes, each offering a different difficulty level of puzzles and hints, however neither of these changes affect the actual plot of the game. The game is based on the best-selling Nancy Drew book of all time, The Secret at Shadow Ranch (1931).

Plot
Nancy Drew is invited to Shadow Ranch in Arizona for a vacation. On the first day there, Nancy discovers that the owners of the ranch, Ed and Bet Rawley, are gone. The previous evening, a glowing horse came galloping up to the ranch, causing a huge commotion, and shortly after, Mr. Rawley was bitten by a venomous snake and rushed to the hospital.

Dirk Valentine, an outlaw from the 1880s, was romantically involved with the sheriff's daughter, Frances Humber, who lived at Shadow Ranch. Dirk was arrested and eventually hanged, but local legend says that Dirk's horse has come back to avenge its master and that misfortune will befall whoever sets eyes on it.

Development

Characters
Nancy Drew - Nancy is an 18-year-old amateur detective from the fictional town of River Heights in the United States. She is the only playable character in the game, which means the player must solve the mystery from her perspective.
Dave Gregory - Dave is the ranch foreman. Always polite and very shy, Dave is a man of frustratingly few words who is mainly concerned with doing his job and doing it well. He grows very fond of Nancy over the course of the game.
Tex Britten - Tex is the ranch's head wrangler. An old-fashioned cowpoke, his weathered face and cynical attitude reflect the fact that he feels much more at home with horses and cattle than with humans. He dislikes city folk, and enjoys putting Nancy in situations that he thinks she can't handle. He has a secret relationship with Mary Yazzie.
Shorty Thurmond - The ranch cook, Shorty, is more talkative than the other two ranch hands combined. He loves to gossip and for that reason loves having Nancy around. He also loves to cook, despite doing it badly, and takes great pride in the food he serves. An admitted opportunist, he's always looking for ways to get rich quick, but has failed every time.
Mary Yazzie - Mary is a Native American who runs a store on the land adjacent to Shadow Ranch. She knows all about the history of the area, especially as it pertains to the ancient Pueblo people who once inhabited the nearby cliff dwellings. She has repeatedly offered to purchase a portion of the Rawley's land, allegedly in search of petrified wood, but her offers have been continuously rejected. She has a secret relationship with Tex Britten.

Cast
Nancy Drew - Lani Minella
Bess Marvin / Frances Humber - Abby Murray
George Fayne - Patty Pomplun
Frank Hardy - Wayne Rawley
Joe Hardy - Rob Jones
Tex Britten - David S. Hogan
Mary Yazzie - Amy Broomhall
Shorty Thurmond / Mineral Map Guy / Radio Voice / Charleena's Assistant - Jonah Von Spreekin
Dave Gregory - Stephen Hando
Charleena Purcell / Radio Voice - Julie Rawley
Bet Rawley - Shannon Kipp
Ed Rawley - John Nelson
Sheriff Hernandez / Radio Voice / Dirk Valentine - Gary Hoffman
Meryl Humber - Max Holechek

Nancy Drew Mobile Mysteries: Shadow Ranch
In early 2011, Her Interactive released an app called Shadow Ranch under their new sub-series of Nancy Drew games entitled Mobile Mysteries. Shadow Ranch is a story-based gamebook app with the book aspect of it as the actual text of the Shadow Ranch novel and the game aspect of it as mini-games within the story. The game shows the voices and screenshots of characters and locations from The Secret of Shadow Ranch PC game. Shadow Ranch is available only for the iPad, iPhone, and iPod Touch, priced at $2.99 for the iPad and $0.99 for the iPhone and iPod Touch.

Reception

In the United States, Secret of the Shadow Ranchs computer version sold between 100,000 and 300,000 units by August 2006. By that date, the combined sales of Nancy Drew computer games had reached 2.1 million copies in the United States alone. Remarking upon this success, Edge called Nancy Drew a "powerful franchise".

References

2004 video games
Detective video games
Video games based on Nancy Drew
Point-and-click adventure games
Video games developed in the United States
Video games scored by Kevin Manthei
Video games set in Arizona
Windows games
IOS games
Her Interactive games
Single-player video games
North America-exclusive video games